Mom Rajawongse Seni Pramoj (26 May 190528 July 1997) was three times the Prime Minister of Thailand, a politician in the Democrat Party, lawyer, diplomat and professor. A descendant of the Thai royal family, he was the great-grandson of King Rama II. His final two terms as PM sandwiched the only term of his brother, Kukrit Pramoj.

Biography
Born a son of Prince Khamrob and mother Daeng (Bunnag), he was educated at Trent College in Derbyshire before obtaining a BA second class honours degree in jurisprudence from Worcester College, Oxford. He continued his studies at Gray's Inn, London, receiving first honours. After returning to Thailand he studied Thai Law, and following six months as a trainee at the Supreme Court, he started to work at the Justice Civil Court. Later, he was transferred to the Foreign Ministry and in 1940 was sent to the United States as Thai ambassador.

Free Thai Movement

Japanese forces invaded Thailand early on the morning of 8 December 1941, shortly after the attack on the United States at Pearl Harbor, Hawaii. The Prime Minister, Field Marshal Plaek Phibunsongkhram, ordered a ceasefire at noon, entering into an armistice that allowed the Japanese to use Thai military installations in their invasion of Malaya and Burma. On 21 December, a formal military alliance with Japan was concluded.

The Phibun government declared war on Great Britain and the United States on 25 January 1942. Although the Thai ambassador in London delivered Thailand's declaration of war to the British administration, Seni refused to do so. Instead, he considered organising a resistance movement in the United States.

Following a late morning interview with Secretary Cordell Hull on 8 December, Seni returned to his legation to confer with his staff. The ambassador and his staff unanimously decided to cast their lot with the Allies. Late the same afternoon, he returned to the State Department to offer their services to the Allied cause. Blaming pro-Japanese elements for the early Thai surrender, he spoke to Hull of unfreezing Thai assets in the United States for further prosecution of the war and suggested that the Thais in the country might "organise and preserve a government of true patriotic, liberty-loving Thais while his government is in the clutches of Japan."

The State Department decided to act as if Seni continued to represent Thailand. This enabled him to tap into the frozen Thai assets. When asked to draw up a list of "reliable and influential Thai nationals known to be definitely patriotic and anti-Japanese" by the State Department (at the suggestion of John P. Davies), Seni named Regent Pridi Phanomyong, politicians Khuang Aphaiwong and Wilat Osathanon, and diplomats Phraya Sisena and Direk Jayanama as "reliables".

Seni advanced plans to mobilise Thai volunteers in support of the Allies. Beyond the legation staffers and their families, most other Thai residents were students enrolled at colleges and universities, including institutions such as Harvard, the Massachusetts Institute of Technology, and Cornell. Many chose to stay following the Thai declaration of war in January, refusing repatriation. Most, like Seni, saw their nation as a victim of Japanese aggression.

Post-war years

Seni became prime minister on 17 September 1945, the day he returned to Bangkok. However, he found his position as the head of a cabinet packed with Pridi's loyalists quite uncomfortable. Northeastern populist politicians like Tiang Sirikhanth and Bangkok newcomers like Sanguan Tularaksa were not people the aristocratic Seni preferred to associate with. They, in turn, viewed Seni as an elitist who was entirely out of touch with Thailand's political realities. Pridi continued to wield power behind the scenes as he had done during the Khuang government. The regent's looming presence and overarching authority rankled the proud, thin-skinned Seni, fuelling a personal animosity that would poison Thailand’s postwar politics.

The Pramoj brothers subsequently joined the newly formed Democrat Party in 1946, which was for the most part made up of royalists and conservative reactionaries. Seni would spend the next two years vigorously carrying out a personal campaign against Pridi. Earlier in the year he had called for an investigation of the use of the US$500,000 in Thai assets unfrozen by the US government that he had turned over to the OSS. Insinuating the money had been transferred to the senior statesman, he lamented that "most of the money had not been spent for what it was intended." An independent investigatory panel, however, found no mistake, concluding that the Free Thai had "performed remarkably well" and that the Thai people "owe a great deal to them." The outcome left the ex-prime minister looking extremely foolish.

Seni soon got his revenge, however. In the immediate aftermath of King Ananda Mahidol's death, Seni and his party launched relentless attacks against the government and accused Pridi of being responsible for the king's assassination, the implausibility of the charge notwithstanding.

In November 1947 the Democrat Party cooperated with disgruntled army officers to oust the government of Thawan Thamrongnawasawat. As part of the deal, Seni was awarded a cabinet portfolio in Khuang's coup-installed cabinet.

On Tuesday, 14 June 1949, in a lecture delivered before the Siam Society, Seni pleaded, "[I] happen to belong to that peculiar species known as politicians who are in the incorrigible habit of attempting to accomplish the impossible." Word had gotten around that his brother and he had been "getting up a little English translation of some of King Mongkut's public papers and private correspondence...without actually putting it to a final execution." He chooses to speak of the king in his capacity as a legislator, "because legislation is the field I am more closely familiar with than any other." Seni provides, "ample evidence to show that the King was the first and foremost democrat of our country," and quotes from an Act declaring an election whereby "any person, even though he be a slave, who is believed to be so sufficiently possessed of wisdom and restraint as to be able to give clear and satisfactory judgment in accordance with truth, justice and the law may be elected as judge." With regard to the 1944 semi-fictionalized biographical novel Anna and the King of Siam and the 1946 Hollywood  film of the same title, Seni quotes from Acts and judicial decisions that give the lie to the fiction.

The 1970s and later life 

Seni returned to his job as a lawyer, but remained active in the Democrat Party during the period of military rule. He served again briefly as prime minister from 15 February to 13 March 1975, when he was defeated and replaced by his younger brother, Rajawongse Kukrit Pramoj. However, Kukrit's government only lasted until 20 April 1976, when Seni regained the top political office.

Seni's final term was a time of crisis in the nation. A right-wing backlash against leftist student demonstrators culminated in the Thammasat University massacre on 6 October 1976,  the military forced him out of office and installed hard-line royalist Tanin Kraivixien as premier.

Seni decided to resign as the leader of the Democrat Party and left politics permanently. He worked as a lawyer until his retirement.

Pramoj died on 26 July, 1997 of heart disease and kidney failure from Bangkok Hospital at the age of 92.

Honours

Academic rank
 Professor of Thammasat University
 Professor of Chulalongkorn University

References

External links

 
 The Home of M R Kukrit Pramoj - a legacy of Thailand's famous son
 Asian History

Seni Pramoj
Seni Pramoj
Seni Pramoj
Seni Pramoj
Seni Pramoj
Seni Pramoj
Seni Pramoj
Seni Pramoj
Seni Pramoj
Seni Pramoj
Seni Pramoj
Seni Pramoj
Seni Pramoj
Seni Pramoj
Alumni of Worcester College, Oxford
People educated at Trent College
1905 births
1997 deaths
Deaths from kidney failure
Deaths from cancer in Thailand
Seni Pramoj
Seni Pramoj
Seni Pramoj
Leaders ousted by a coup